Dicranotropis is a genus of true bugs belonging to the family Delphacidae.

Species:
 Dicranotropis beckeri
 Dicranotropis hamata

References

Delphacidae